Pyropteron kautzi is a moth of the family Sesiidae. It is found in Spain.

The larvae possibly feed on Thymus, Sideritis and/or Arenaria species.

References

Moths described in 1930
Sesiidae